Sunndalsfjella is a mountain range in Innlandet, in southern Norway, to the north of Dombås. The range is transversed by the E6, with most of the mountain range lying within the Dovrefjell-Sunndalsfjella national park area. 

Sunndalsfjell has 259 glaciers and 23 peaks of over 1,800m elevation.

References 
 

Mountains of Innlandet